Afaq Raheem (born 11 October 1985) is a First-class cricketer. He is a right handed batsman. He has represented Zarai Taraqiati Bank Limited, Azad Jammu and Kashmir Cricket Association Under-19s, Khan Research Laboratories; and Islamabad Leopards. He has selected for Test series against Sri Lanka in 2012 season.

In September 2019, he was named in Northern's squad for the 2019–20 Quaid-e-Azam Trophy tournament.

References

External links

1985 births
Living people
Pakistani cricketers
People from Mirpur District
Azad Kashmiri people
Rawalpindi cricketers
Islamabad cricketers
Zarai Taraqiati Bank Limited cricketers
Federal Areas cricketers
Rawalpindi Rams cricketers
Islamabad Leopards cricketers
Punjab (Pakistan) cricketers